Banak is a village in Bagh Safa Rural District, Sarchehan District, Bavanat County, Fars Province, Iran. At the 2006 census, its population was 47, in 14 families.

References 

Populated places in Sarchehan County